Ataköy (literally "elder village") is a Turkish place name that may refer to:

 Ataköy, Bakırköy, a quarter in Bakırköy district of Istanbul Province, Turkey
 Ataköy Athletics Arena, an indoor sporting arena in the neighborhood
 Galleria Ataköy, a mall in the neighborhood
 Ataköy, Bismil
 Ataköy, Aksaray, a village in the district of Aksaray, Aksaray Province, Turkey
 Ataköy, Haymana, a village in the district of Haymana, Ankara Province, Turkey
 Ataköy, Karacasu, a village in the district of Karacasu, Aydın Province, Turkey
 Ataköy, Karataş, a village in the district of Karataş, Adana Province, Turkey
 Ataköy, Köprüköy
 Ataköy Dam, a dam in Tokat Province, Turkey